William Somerville may refer to:
William Somervile (1675–1742), English poet, also written as William Somerville
William Somerville (cricketer) (born 1984), New Zealand cricketer
William Somerville (physician) (1771–1860), Scottish physician
William E. Somerville (1869–1950), Scottish aircraft engineer
William Lyon Somerville (1886–1965), Canadian architect
William Lorne Northmore Somerville (1921–2009), Canadian lawyer
William Somerville, 1st Baron Athlumney (1802–1873), Anglo-Irish politician
William C. Somerville (1790–1826), American plantation owner, author, historian and diplomat
William Somerville, 2nd Lord Somerville (died 1456), member of the Scottish Parliament
William Somerville (priest), Archdeacon of Armagh
Sir William Somerville (agriculturalist) (1860-1932), British agriculturalist